Murray Bridge Airport  is in the locality of Pallamana,  northwest of Murray Bridge in South Australia. It is situated on Reedy Creek Road and is also known as Pallamana Aerodrome or Pallamanna Airfield. Avgas is available from a 24H Credit Card swipe Bowser.

Runways 
It has two runways:

Flying schools 
There is one general aviation (GA) flying school, Murray Bridge Flying School, which offers training PPL, Night VFR, IFR, CPL, Instructors ratings as well as various ground theory courses.  Its fleet includes multiple 4-seat light aircraft such as the Piper Archer and Cessna 172 as well as twin engine aircraft such as the Beechcraft Baron.

There are also two ultralight aircraft (Recreational Aviation Australia) flying schools: 'Recreational Pilots Academy' and 'Murray Bridge Light Aircraft Flying School'.

The Murray Bridge Gliding Club Inc. is based in Hangar 19 and offers motor glider hire.

See also
 List of airports in South Australia

References

Airports in South Australia